My Story (Stylized as MY STORY) is the sixth studio album by Japanese singer-songwriter Ayumi Hamasaki, released on December 15, 2004 by avex trax. The album's lyrics were written in their entirety by Hamasaki herself, with composition on the album handled by a team of composers including Kazuhito Kikuchi, Bounceback, Tetsuya Yukumi, and, on some songs, Hamasaki, under the pen name CREA.

By the end of her 2004 arena tour, Hamasaki became dissatisfied with her position at Avex. She felt that the company was treating her as a product rather than a human being and artist. After her two previous efforts, I am… and RAINBOW, which she felt had been rushed, Hamasaki decided that on her next record she would not write to "give people hope" or write "something good"; instead, she simply wrote "freely and honestly" with no set theme. These writing sessions resulted in autobiographical lyrics, exploring Hamasaki's own emotions and reminisces about her career. The music of MY STORY reflects the free theme of the lyrics; its noticeable rock overtones expressed Hamasaki's liking for rock music. Pleased with its sound, Hamasaki declared that My Story was the first album of her career with which she felt truly satisfied.

Lead single "Moments" was released on March 31, 2004 to positive reviews from critics, who praised its rock influences. It was a commercial success too, debuting at number one, selling over 300,000 copies, and receiving a platinum certification. The second single, "Inspire", was successful as well, reaching number one and being certified platinum; it sold over 329,000 units, becoming the highest-selling single from My Story. Similarly, "Carols" topped the charts in Japan and was certified Platinum.

My Story was positively received by critics, who appreciated its aggressive style compared to Western pop music at the time, and its alternative sound. A commercial success, it became Hamasaki's sixth consecutive number-one album in Japan, debuting at the top spot with first week sales of 574,321 copies. In its 43-week chart run, My Story sold 1,132,444 copies and became the seventh best-selling album of the year in Japan. Combined with the sales of its three singles, My Story sold 2,073,640 copies and is the 222nd best-selling album in Japan of all time, this is Hamasaki's final album to hit over a million sales.

Promotion
The album includes the three singles: "Moments", "Inspire", and "Carols". During its first release, four different limited edition covers were released for fans to choose from. There were also two versions released, the first that included the CD only and a second that included a DVD that contained music videos to some (including the singles) of the tracks from the album. For promotional purposes, Ayumi Hamasaki Arena Tour 2005 A: My Story was scheduled from January to April. During the concert tour, My Story was released again in two more formats, SACD and in DVD Audio. All of the lyrics on the album were written by Hamasaki and three of the tracks, "Wonderland", "Winding Road" and "Humming 7/4", were composed by her under the pen name "Crea". It topped the Oricon charts for several weeks (the Japanese equivalent of Billboard). It is currently certified four times platinum in Japan. My Story is the 222nd best-selling album in Japan to date.

Since the single "Moments", her singles have been released in at least two versions, CD and CD+DVD format. "Carols" featured four versions of the single: CD, CD+DVD, SACD, and DVD Audio.

Track listing

My Story Classical

My Story Classical is a compilation with classical versions of the songs from Ayumi Hamasaki's album My Story. My Story Classical was released on March 24, 2005. Most of the tracks were recorded with the Lamoureux Orchestra of France.

Oricon charts

Album

 Total Sales :  1,200,000 (Japan)
 Total Sales :  1,420,000 (Avex)

Singles

Total single sales: 1,135,000
Total album and single sales: 2,335,000

Release history

Notes

References

Ayumi Hamasaki albums
2004 albums
Avex Group albums
Japanese-language albums